Nathia Gali or Nathiagali is a hill station and mountain resort town located in the Abbottabad District of Khyber Pakhtunkhwa, Pakistan. It is located at the centre of the Galyat range, where several hill stations are situated. Nathia Gali is known for its scenic beauty, hiking tracks and pleasant weather, which is much cooler than the rest of the Galyat range due to it being at a higher altitude.

History
During British rule Nathia Gali, then part of Abbottabad tehsil of Hazara District, served as the summer headquarters of the Chief Commissioner of the (then) Peshawar division of the Punjab. The town along with Dunga Gali constituted a notified area under the Punjab Municipalities Act, 1891. The income in 1903-4 was Rs. 3,000 chiefly derived from a house tax, whilst expenditure was Rs. 1,900.

Climate
The weather of Nathiagali remains cool, pleasant and foggy in summers (1 May to 31 August). During the monsoon season (1 July to 16 September), rain is expected almost every day. Cold winds start to chill the weather in autumn. winters (1 November to 28 February) are very cold and chilly. In December and January, heavy snowfall occurs here. The weather remains cold in spring. Here most comfortable weather is the summer season.
Frequent rainfall occurs here annually. Rainfall lies between 1650mm-1850mm annually.in winter temperature can drop to _10*C  and in summer it rise to a high of 30*C.

Transportation
The town is connected to Abbottabad and Murree by Nathiagali road. Public transport runs daily from Abbottabad and Rawalpindi to Nathiagali.

Between December to January, heavy snowfall can occur in this area and the road leading to Nathiagali is sometimes blocked due to heavy snow.

Tourism
Nathia Gali town also serves as the administrative centre of Nathia Gali Union Council. It is today located in what is the Abbottabad District, Khyber Pakhtunkhwa. At an elevation of 2,410 m (8,000 ft), it is a popular tourist resort in the summer months. It is forested with pine, cedar, oak walnut and also oak and maple trees.

During the summer, Nathia Gali is relatively popular amongst tourists, but due to its limited area and availability of property, it is not thronged by as many people as the hill-station Murree, which is only an hour away, even though it has more recreation. Nathiagali is known for a beautiful trek that leads to Thandiani that passes through Dagri naka.

Ayubia National Park is also one of the spots here that tourists and nature lovers often visit.

Scenery 

The natural scenery is highly attractive. Nathia Gali is famous for its lush green meadows, deep forests of oak, cedar and pine, where fog in July/August present a glory. In winter snowfall adds to the scene.
Nathia Gali has a church, St. Matthew's, a remnant from the British period and made entirely of wood. It is situated at the edge of the mountain with a nice panorama towards Kashmir.
Nathia Gali has a mini bazaar. Mukshpuri and Miranjani are two nearby high peaks. On a clear day, the Nanga Parbat can be seen in the distance.

Wildlife

The Nathia Gali region is home to various species of birds, insects, butterflies and other animals such as rhesus monkeys. The World Wildlife Fund has an office in the Galliat and has assisted in the breeding and reintroduction of the species of the near-extinct common hill leopard in the forests of the Ayubia National park, right by Dungagali and Nathia Gali. This area was thought to be a perfect habitat for them but according to local reports they frequently came out of the forest after cattle of the local villagers and were occasionally shot. Packs of pi-dogs which were previously considered to be a night-time menace can no longer be seen anywhere in the Galliat; it is thought that most have been killed by leopards. 

In the summer of 2006, several women were found dead in the deep valleys of Galliat with wounds from attacks. A large leopard was caught and eventually shot. His body has been stuffed and kept in the Dunga Gali Wildlife Museum, where he has been named the 'Ghost of Galyat'. However, despite their reputation, these leopards are rarely spotted.

Subdivisions

The Union Council of Nathia Gali is divided into the following areas: Bagan, Donga Gali, Jhansa, Keri Sarafali, Keri Raiki, Lassan, Malach, Nathiagali Pasala, and Badhair. Badhair is the central part of the Nathiagali Union Council.

Ethnic groups 
The main tribe of Nathia Gali are the Karlal, and a minority of Dhunds (who now call themselves 'Dhund-Abbasis'). The locals are a kin to the people of other parts of Galyat and speak the Hindko language. Until well into the 1960s, most of these tribes and clans were mostly living rather basic and primitive lives, due to lack of educational and employment opportunities and most of them had to seek jobs and education down in the plains and cities such as Rawalpindi, Lahore, Peshawar and even as far away as Karachi; but in more recent times, with economic development, many of them are either employed locally in the tourism industry or in various jobs and businesses in the Abbottabad area. It is monitored by GDA.

Gallery

See also
Galyat
Abbottabad

References

External links

  Places to Visit in Abbottabad
 Miranjani Trek by Shaikh Muhammad Ali
 The Pipe Line Trek by Shaikh Muhammad Ali
 Mokshpuri Trek by Shaikh Muhammad Ali
 http://www.nathiagali.com
 
 Nathiagali Pictures
 Governor's House
 Sarhad Tourism Corporation, Government of Khyber Pakhtunkhwa, Pakistan
 http://www.nathiagali.com/?page_id=16
 Hotels in Nathiagali (reservation)
 Hotel in Nathiagali (book your corporate event)
 FAQ about Nathiagali (Question Answers about Nathiagali)

Populated places in Abbottabad District
Hill stations in Pakistan
Union councils of Abbottabad District
Galyat of Pakistan
Tourist attractions in Khyber Pakhtunkhwa